Zachary Smith (or other forms such as Zac, Zach, Zack) may refer to:

People

Arts and entertainment
Armistead Burwell Smith IV, also known as Zach Smith, American rock musician with Three Mile Pilot and Pinback
Zachary Smith (guitarist), American rock guitarist with The Loud Family, The Flying Monkeys, and Power13
Zachary Dylan Smith (born 1994), American actor
Zack Smith, American rock guitarist and songwriter with Scandal (American band)
Zak Smith (born 1976), American artist and alternative porn star
Zachary Cole Smith (born 1984), American musician, model and music video director

Characters
Zac Smith (Shortland Street), a fictional character on the New Zealand soap opera Shortland Street
Zacharias Smith, a fictional character from the Harry Potter books by J.K. Rowling
Zachary Smith, a fictional character originated by Jonathan Harris on the TV series Lost in Space

Military and industry
Zach "Hoeken" Smith, a co-founder of RepRap and MakerBot
Zachary D. Smith (1990–2010), a U.S. Marine Lance Corporal killed in Afghanistan, memorialized by Zachary Smith Post Office
Zachary Smith Reynolds (1911–1932), American amateur aviator and tobacco industry heir

Sports
Zac Smith (born 1990), Australian-rules footballer
Zack Smith (born 1988), Canadian ice hockey player
Zach Smith (American football) (born 1998), American football quarterback

Places
Zachary Smith Post Office, in Hornell, New York